Khoja Ahror Valiy mosque is a mosque in Tashkent, Uzbekistan. Also known as the Jama or Dzhuma Mosque, it was built in 1451 by Sheikh Ubaydullo Khoja Akhror (1404-1490).

See also
 List of first mosques by country 
 Jama masjid

External links
Image
History

Mosques in Tashkent
Mosques completed in 1451